Sara Louise Neil (born 2 September 1960) is a Canadian retired road bicycle racer, who won the bronze medal in the women's individual road race at the 1987 Pan American Games. A resident of Vancouver, British Columbia, she represented Canada at the same event at the 1988 Summer Olympics, finishing in 39th place. She has two daughters. She now teaches physical education at Lord Byng Secondary in Vancouver, British Columbia.

References

External links
Canadian Olympic Committee

1960 births
Living people
Canadian female cyclists
Cyclists at the 1987 Pan American Games
Cyclists at the 1988 Summer Olympics
Olympic cyclists of Canada
Sportspeople from Guildford
Sportspeople from Vancouver
Pan American Games bronze medalists for Canada
Pan American Games medalists in cycling
Medalists at the 1987 Pan American Games